Norman Kelly may refer to:

Norm Kelly, Canadian politician
Norm Kelly (Australian politician), Australian politician
Norman Kelly (footballer)

See also
Norman Kelley, opera singer